Boat Harbour West 37 is a Mi'kmaq reserve located in Pictou County, Nova Scotia.

It was created between 1962 and 1963, and its 98.2 ha are used solely by the  Pictou Landing First Nation.

References

Indian reserves in Nova Scotia
Communities in Pictou County
Mi'kmaq in Canada